Just Dance is a rhythm game series developed and published by Ubisoft. The original Just Dance game was released on the Wii in 2009 in North America, Europe, and Australia.

Gameplay

Just Dance is a motion-based dance video game for multiple players, with each game including a collection of classic and modern songs each with its own dance choreographies. During each song, players mirror a dance performed by dancers on the screen, following moves that appear as pictorials on the bottom right corner of the screen, and are awarded for their accuracy. Additionally, there are gold moves in which players must strike a pose or complete the hardest move in the dance in order to earn bonus points. Players are given ranks based on how well they do. Depending on the game and system it is played on, the game can be played with either motion controllers or camera devices (such as the Wii Remote and Kinect), or using an app downloaded on a smart device. The game can be played by up to six players at once on eighth- and ninth-generation consoles, as well as the PC version of Just Dance 2017 and the Stadia version of Just Dance 2020, Just Dance 2021, and Just Dance 2022, with support for a gamepad and a keyboard used to navigate the menus. This excludes Dance Crew routines for Kinect users for the Xbox One version, as well as Wii Remote users for the Wii U version, and PlayStation Move users for the PlayStation 3 and PlayStation 4 versions, which are limited to four players. Seventh generation consoles and the Wii U versions of Just Dance 4 to Just Dance 2015 and the Wii U version of Just Dance 2019 are also limited to four players.

Games

Main series
Just Dance The first game in the Just Dance series was released on 17 November 2009, with songs by MC Hammer, Elvis Presley, Iggy Pop, The Beach Boys, Baha Men, Spice Girls, Gorillaz and others.
Just Dance 2 Just Dance 2 was released on 12 October 2010. This installment features 48 tracks including DLC tracks, and was the first and only installment to date to support 8-player sessions. It also supports downloadable content. It has over 40 tracks by Kesha, Outkast, The Pussycat Dolls, Wham!, Avril Lavigne, Mika, Rihanna, and others.
Just Dance 3 Released on 7 October 2011. This installment was announced at the Ubisoft E3 conference on 6 June 2011, the first installment to be released on Xbox 360 (with Kinect support) and PlayStation 3 (with PlayStation Move support). It includes over 40 tracks by Jessie J, Katy Perry, Gwen Stefani, A-ha, Robin Sparkles, Lenny Kravitz, The Black Eyed Peas, and others.

Just Dance 4 Released on 9 October 2012. This installment was announced at the Ubisoft E3 conference on 4 June 2012 and was the first installment to be released on the Wii U. It includes over 50 tracks by Carly Rae Jepsen, Pink, The B-52's, Rihanna, Flo Rida, and others.
Just Dance 2014 Released on 8 October 2013. The trailer for the game was revealed at the Ubisoft E3 conference on 10 June 2013. It was the first Just Dance game to be released on Xbox One and PlayStation 4. It includes over 40 tracks by Lady Gaga, Nicki Minaj, Psy, One Direction, Chris Brown, Ariana Grande, ABBA, George Michael, Ricky Martin, and others.
Just Dance 2015 Released on 21 October 2014. The trailer for the game was revealed at the Ubisoft E3 conference on 9 June 2014. It includes over 40 tracks by Pharrell Williams, John Newman, Katy Perry, Iggy Azalea, Maroon 5, and others.
Just Dance 2016 Released on 20 October 2015. The game was announced at the Ubisoft E3 conference on 15 June 2015. It includes over 40 tracks by Calvin Harris, David Guetta, Meghan Trainor, Britney Spears, Mark Ronson, Shakira, Kelly Clarkson, Demi Lovato, and others.

Just Dance 2017 Released on 25 October 2016. The game was announced at the Ubisoft E3 conference on 13 June 2016. It includes over 40 tracks by Anitta, Sia, Justin Bieber, The Weeknd, Major Lazer, OneRepublic, Fifth Harmony, Queen, Beyoncé, DNCE, and others. This was the first and only title in the series to be released on Microsoft Windows and macOS via Steam and was the first game in the series to be released on the Nintendo Switch. It was also the first game in the series to not feature a song by Katy Perry.
Just Dance 2018 Released on 24 October 2017. The game was announced at the Ubisoft E3 conference on 12 June 2017. It includes tracks by Bebe Rexha, Bruno Mars, Ariana Grande, Big Freedia, Shakira, Clean Bandit, Dua Lipa, TomSka, Luis Fonsi, Selena Gomez, and others. It was the last game in the series to be released on the PlayStation 3.
Just Dance 2019 Released on 23 October 2018. The trailer for the game was revealed at the Ubisoft E3 conference on 11 June 2018. It includes tracks by Bruno Mars, Big Bang, Blackpink, Sean Paul, J Balvin, Camila Cabello, Daddy Yankee, and others. It was the last game in the series to be released on the Wii U and the last game overall to be released for the Xbox 360 worldwide.
Just Dance 2020 Released on 5 November 2019. The game was announced at the Ubisoft E3 conference on 10 June 2019. It includes tracks from Ariana Grande, Billie Eilish, Ed Sheeran, 2NE1, Panic! at the Disco, Khalid and others. It was the first game in the series to be released on Stadia and the last game to be physically released on the Wii in North America.
Just Dance 2021 Released on 12 November 2020. It was unveiled on 26 August 2020 during the Nintendo Direct Mini: Partner Showcase web presentation. It includes tracks from Dua Lipa, Twice, Lady Gaga, Ariana Grande, Eminem, NCT 127, Blackpink, Selena Gomez and others. It was the first game in the series to be released on the Xbox Series X/S and PlayStation 5.
Just Dance 2022 Released on 4 November 2021. It was unveiled on 12 June 2021 during the Ubisoft Forward E3 2021 web presentation. It includes tracks from Todrick Hall, Anuel AA, Imagine Dragons, Ciara, Meghan Trainor, Camila Cabello, Olivia Rodrigo, Bella Poarch, Pabllo Vittar and others. It was the last game in the series to be released on the PlayStation 4, Xbox One and Stadia.
Just Dance 2023 Edition Released on 22 November 2022. It was unveiled on 10 September 2022 during the Ubisoft Forward September 2022 web presentation. It includes tracks from Justin Timberlake, Bruno Mars, Dua Lipa, Ava Max, BTS, Taylor Swift and others. It is the final annual installment of the series, with all future content being added to the game through online updates.

Japan exclusives
Just Dance Wii A Japanese version of Just Dance published and edited by Nintendo but developed by Ubisoft Paris. It was released on 13 October 2011, only for the Wii. It features 16 J-pop songs from Exile, Kara, Kumi Koda, and AKB48, as well as 11 songs from Just Dance and Just Dance 2 and only one song based on the Super Mario Bros. game that can be unlocked by playing all of the other songs. According to Media Create, as of 11 March 2012, the game sold 560,301 copies in Japan.
Just Dance Wii 2 The second Japanese Just Dance game published and edited by Nintendo but developed by Ubisoft Paris. It was released on 26 July 2012, only for the Wii. It includes 20 J-pop songs from Exile, Kara, Speed, Da Pump, T-ara, DJ Ozma, 2PM, Happiness, and MAX, as well as 15 songs from Just Dance 2 and Just Dance 3.
Just Dance Wii U The third Japanese Just Dance game published and edited by Nintendo but developed by Ubisoft Paris. It was revealed in a Nintendo Direct on 14 February 2014, and was released on 3 April 2014, only for the Wii U. It includes 20 J-pop songs by SKE48, AKB48, BIGBANG, Kyary Pamyu Pamyu, and Momoiro Clover Z, as well as 15 songs from Just Dance 4 and Just Dance 2014.
Yo-kai Watch Dance: Just Dance Special Version The fourth Japanese Just Dance game developed by Ubisoft and co-developed and published by Level-5, featuring songs and characters from the Yo-kai Watch video game and anime franchise. It was released on 5 December 2015, only for the Wii U.

Just Dance Kids series
Just Dance Kids Released 9 November 2010 for the Wii, it was created with an emphasis on songs popular with children. It features 42 tracks from various kids' songs, songs from TV series including Yo Gabba Gabba! and The Wiggles and current pop hits from various artists, including Justin Bieber, Selena Gomez & The Scene, and Demi Lovato. The game was released in Australia and Europe under the name Dance Juniors in February 2011.
Just Dance Kids 2 The second installment in the kids themed lineup, released 25 October 2011 for the PlayStation 3, Wii and Xbox 360. It features 40 tracks from various kids' songs, songs from films including Shrek 2, Gnomeo and Juliet, Despicable Me and Disney's The Lion King and Tangled, songs from TV series including Yo Gabba Gabba! and The Wiggles, and current pop hits from various artists, including Selena Gomez & The Scene, Ashley Tisdale, and Bruno Mars. The game was released in Australia and Europe as Just Dance Kids in November 2011 because of the first installment being called Dance Juniors there.
Just Dance Kids 2014 The third installment in the kids themed lineup, released 22 October 2013 for the Wii, Wii U and Xbox 360. It features over 30 tracks that includes the original versions of songs from artists including Demi Lovato, One Direction, and Bridgit Mendler and songs from TV series and films, including Victorious, Fraggle Rock, Yo Gabba Gabba! and The Wiggles.

Disney Party series
Just Dance: Disney Party Just Dance: Disney Party is the first installment in the Disney Party series, a spin-off to the Just Dance Kids series, published for the Wii and Xbox 360. It was released on 23 October 2012 in North America, 25 October 2012 in Australia and 26 October 2012 in Europe. It includes songs from Disney films, and current pop tracks from Disney Channel.
Just Dance: Disney Party 2 Released on 20 October 2015 for the Wii, Wii U, Xbox 360 and Xbox One; Just Dance: Disney Party 2 features a variety of hit songs, with more than 20 tracks from Disney Channel TV series and original movies, such as Descendants, Teen Beach Movie, Austin and Ally, Girl Meets World, K.C. Undercover and Liv and Maddie.

Experience series
Michael Jackson: The Experience Another spin-off of the Just Dance series, featuring 26 songs and full dance choreography by Michael Jackson. It was released in November 2010 for the Wii, PlayStation 3 and Mac OS X.
The Black Eyed Peas Experience Yet another spin-off of the Just Dance series, the game features more than 20 tracks by The Black Eyed Peas and was released in November 2011 for the Xbox 360 and Wii. Note that the Xbox 360 version has a completely different gameplay from that of the Wii version.
The Hip Hop Dance Experience The third Experience game by Ubisoft. It includes top hit tracks by artists like Flo Rida, B.o.B, Rihanna and much more. It was released in 2012 for the Wii and Xbox 360.

Other spin-offs
Dance on Broadway A spin-off released in 2010 for the Wii and 2011 for the PlayStation 3, featuring a selection of 20 songs from Broadway musicals. Some songs included are: "I Just Can't Wait to Be King" from The Lion King, "Bend and Snap" from Legally Blonde, "Fame" from Fame and "Time Warp" from The Rocky Horror Picture Show.
The Smurfs Dance Party A spin-off of the Just Dance Kids series, featuring 25 songs. The game allows players to dance alongside Papa Smurf, Clumsy Smurf, Brainy Smurf, Grouchy Smurf, Gutsy Smurf, Smurfette, and Gargamel. It was released for the Wii on 19 July 2011 in North America, 29 July 2011 in Europe and 8 September 2011 in Australia.
ABBA: You Can Dance Another spin-off of the Just Dance series, featuring 26 ABBA songs. It was released for the Wii on 15 November 2011 in North America, 24 November 2011 in Australia and 25 November 2011 in Europe.

Greatest Hits series
Just Dance: Greatest Hits Just Dance: Greatest Hits (also known as Just Dance: Best Of for PAL Wii) includes Ubisoft's favorite songs from previous titles: Just Dance, Just Dance 2 and Just Dance: Summer Party, only one PS3 exclusive/Wii DLC from Just Dance 3: "Baby Don't Stop Now" by Anja, and the two NTSC Target/Zellers/Xbox 360 PAL exclusive songs from Just Dance 3: "Airplanes" by B.o.B feat. Hayley Williams, and "Only Girl (In the World)" by Rihanna.

Specials
Just Dance: Summer Party Just Dance Summer Party (also known in Australia and Europe as Just Dance 2: Extra Songs) includes most of the downloadable content from Just Dance 2, and two of the Best Buy exclusive songs from that game: "Jai Ho! (You Are My Destiny)" by A.R. Rahman and The Pussycat Dolls feat. Nicole Scherzinger, and "Funkytown" by Lipps Inc. covered by Sweat Invaders in-game. All the songs that were missing from the game were planned to be featured at some point but were scrapped during development. These scrapped songs include: "Crazy Christmas" by Santa Clones, "Spice Up Your Life" by Spice Girls & 3 more.

Others
Just Dance Now Just Dance Now is an app that lets players play Just Dance anywhere after syncing up a device with the website on a television screen or a computer. It does not require a console to be played and the device used to sync the game will be used as a controller in a similar way to the Wii Remote.
Just Dance Controller The Just Dance Controller is an app that lets players play Just Dance anywhere after syncing up a device with a game on a console or computer. The device used to sync a game will be used as a controller in a similar way to the Wii Remote. This was originally known as the Just Dance 2015 Motion Controller for the PS4 and Xbox One versions of Just Dance 2015, it was later renamed to the Just Dance Controller on July 27, 2015. Support for the app was added to the Wii U version of Just Dance 2016, and later the Steam and Nintendo Switch versions of Just Dance 2017 (the Steam version requires a smart device to play). Until Just Dance 2018, there was the photo booth option, which allows the player to take a photo of themselves. Smart device compatibility was removed from the Wii U and Nintendo Switch versions of Just Dance 2019 in October 2018, and later Just Dance 2015 in November 2018. It was later added back to the Nintendo Switch version of Just Dance 2020. It was then added to the Stadia version of Just Dance 2020 and the ninth-generation console versions of Just Dance 2021, all which require a smart device to play.
Just Dance Unlimited Just Dance Unlimited is a subscription-based service on Just Dance 2016, Just Dance 2017, Just Dance 2018, Just Dance 2019, Just Dance 2020, Just Dance 2021, and Just Dance 2022, which replaced downloadable content. As of Just Dance 2022, Just Dance Unlimited features over 700 Just Dance hits, with new exclusive songs including "Cheerleader (Felix Jaehn Remix)" by OMI, "Better When I'm Dancin" by Meghan Trainor, "Shut Up and Dance" by Walk the Moon, positions by Ariana Grande and many more. Ever since "No Lie" was released as an exclusive track for Just Dance Unlimited, newly added songs on the service would only be available on the newest game in the series.
Just Dance+ Just Dance+ is a Just Dance subscription service that launched alongside Just Dance 2023 Edition. It serves as a replacement for Just Dance Unlimited and features songs from previous Just Dance games alongside new exclusive songs.

Reception

Reviews 
All game reviews are from Metacritic.

Main series 
Just Dance: 49 out of 100

Just Dance 2: 74 out of 100

Just Dance 3: 70 out of 100 (Xbox 360), 74 out of 100 (Wii), and 75 out of 100 (PS3)

Just Dance 4: 66 out of 100 (Wii U), 74 out of 100 (Wii), and 77 out of 100 (Xbox 360 and PS3)

Just Dance 2014: 71 out of 100 (Xbox One), 72 out of 100 (Wii U), 75 out of 100 (PS4), 77 out of 100 (PS3), and 79 out of 100 (Xbox 360)

Just Dance 2015: 70 out of 100 (Xbox One), 72 out of 100 (PS4), and 75 out of 100 (Wii U)

Just Dance 2016: 66 out of 100 (Xbox One), and 73 out of 100 (PS4 and Wii U)

Just Dance 2017: 72 out of 100 (Nintendo Switch), and 73 out of 100 (Xbox One and PS4)

Just Dance 2018: 71 out of 100 (Nintendo Switch), and 75 out of 100 (PS4)

Just Dance 2019: 72 out of 100 (Nintendo Switch), and 77 out of 100 (Xbox One and PS4)

Just Dance 2020: 74 out of 100 (Nintendo Switch), and 77 out of 100 (PS4)

Just Dance 2021: 70 out of 100 (Nintendo Switch)

Just Dance 2022: 71 out of 100 (Nintendo Switch), and 83 out of 100 (Xbox Series X/S)

Just Dance 2023 Edition: 70 out of 100 (PlayStation 5), 76 out of 100 (Nintendo Switch), and 80 out of 100 (Xbox Series X/S)

Spin-offs 
Dance on Broadway: 48 out of 100 (Wii)

Michael Jackson: The Experience: 56 out of 100 (Wii), and 66 out of 100 (PS3)

ABBA: You Can Dance: 66 out of 100

Film
On 14 January 2019, Deadline reported that Screen Gems has acquired motion picture rights to Just Dance with Jason Altman and Margaret Boykin from Ubisoft Film & Television set to produce alongside Jodi Hildebrand and Will Gluck of Olive Bridge Entertainment.

References

 
Ubisoft franchises
Video game franchises introduced in 2009
Dance video games